Antonio Brancaccio, O.P. or Antonio Brancati (died 1518) was a Roman Catholic prelate who served as Bishop of Gravina di Puglia (1508–1518).

Biography
Antonio Brancaccio  was ordained a priest in the Order of Preachers.
On 18 February 1508, he was appointed during the papacy of Pope Julius II as Bishop of Gravina di Puglia.
He served as Bishop of Gravina di Puglia until his death in 1518.

References

External links and additional sources
 (for Chronology of Bishops) 
 (for Chronology of Bishops) 

16th-century Italian Roman Catholic bishops
Bishops appointed by Pope Julius II
1518 deaths
Dominican bishops